John Miller Stotsenburg (November 24, 1858 – April 23, 1899) was a captain of the Sixth U.S. Cavalry, and a colonel of the First Nebraska Volunteers.  He was killed in the Philippine–American War, while leading his regiment in action near Quingua, Bulacan, Philippines on April 23, 1899.

History
Colonel Stotsenburg was a native of New Albany, Indiana, and entered the United States Military Academy from that state on July 1, 1877. His brother was Evan B. Stotsenburg, the twenty-second Indiana Attorney General. He was graduated in 1881, and assigned to the Sixth Cavalry, with which he served in New Mexico, Arizona, Nebraska, and Fort Myer, Virginia.

After graduating from the Infantry and Cavalry School of Application at Fort Leavenworth, he was appointed a Professor of Military Science and Tactics at the University of Nebraska-Lincoln in December 1897. Immediately after the declaration of war with Spain, he was assigned as mustering officer for Nebraska and assisted in organizing its first regiment of which he was appointed a major. With that rank, he took the regiment to the Philippines, where he was promoted to colonel on November 10, 1898.

From the opening of hostilities until after his death, Colonel Stotsenburg's regiment was constantly in the field and always on the firing line.  In the first major engagement of the Philippine–American War, on February 5, 1899, Colonel Stotsenburg personally led his troops into action that resulted in the capture of the San Juan Bridge, the powder magazine, the water work reservoir, the Convent of San Juan del Monte, and San Felipe, all of which were contested heavily by General Emilio Aguinaldo's forces.  The following day, his troops drove the enemy across the Santolan River and captured the water works pumping station before the Filipinos could destroy it.  During those maneuvers, Colonel Stotsenburg commanded more troops than any brigadier general on the field in the Philippines had handled up to that time: the First Nebraska, four guns of the Utah Light Battery, and a battalion of the 23rd U.S. Infantry.

On April 23, 1899, Colonel Stotsenburg was killed in action during the Battle of Quingua while leading a charge on a Filipino position. He was 40 years old at the time of his death and was later buried at Arlington National Cemetery. The former Fort Stotsenburg, established in 1902 and later replaced by Clark Air Base, was named for him.

References

Further reading
 Rosmer, David L. (1986). An annotated pictorial history of Clark Air Base: 1899–1986. Clark Air Base, Philippines (13th Air Force):  Fort Stotsenburg Historical Foundation. 

1858 births
1899 deaths
American military personnel killed in the Philippine–American War
American military personnel of the Philippine–American War
Burials at Arlington National Cemetery
United States Army officers
United States Military Academy alumni
University of Nebraska–Lincoln faculty
People from New Albany, Indiana